Meat plays a much more dominant role in Pakistani cuisine, compared to other South Asian cuisines. Of all the meats, the most popular are chicken, lamb, beef, goat, and fish.Beef is particularly sought after as the meat of choice for kebab dishes or the classic beef shank dish nihari. Seafood is generally not consumed in large amounts, though it is very popular in the coastal areas of Sindh and the Makran coast of Balochistan.

Halal

Muslims follow the Islamic law that lists foods and drinks that are Halal and permissible to consume. The criteria specify both what foods are allowed, and how the food must be prepared.  The foods addressed are mostly types of meat/animal tissue.

Meat dishes

In Pakistan, most vegetables are also cooked with meat cubes or with ground meat. Potatoes can be cooked with cubes of beef, lamb or chicken, or with ground (minced) meat.

Generally, the preparation method involves cooking pieces of meat over medium heat with various spices, or simmered with potatoes.

Barbecue and kebabs

Meat has played an important part in the region of Pakistan for centuries. Sajji is a Baluchi dish from Western Pakistan, made up of lamb with spices, that has also become popular all over the country. Another Balochi meat dish involves building a large outdoor fire and slowly cooking chickens. The chickens are placed on skewers which are staked into the ground close to the fire, so that the radiant heat slowly cooks the prepared chickens.

Kebabs are a staple item in Pakistani cuisine today, and one can find countless varieties all over the country. Each region has its own varieties but some, like Seekh kebab, Chicken Tikka, and Shami kebab, are especially popular varieties throughout the country. Generally, kebabs from Balochistan and the Khyber Pakhtunkhwa are identical to the Afghan style of barbecue, with salt and coriander being the only seasoning used. Karachi and the wider Sindh region arefamous for their spicy kebabs, often marinated in a mixture of spices, lemon juice and dahi (yogurt). Grilled chicken and mutton are also very popular in some cities of Punjab such as Lahore, Gujranwala and Sialkot. Kebab shops are said to be the most profitable food businesses in Pakistan.

Kebabs

Types of kebabs (mainly made of beef or lamb) are:
 Seekh kebab - A long skewer of beef mixed with herbs and seasonings. Takes its name from the skewer.
 Shami kebab - A Shami kebab is a small patty of minced beef or chicken and ground chickpeas and spices.
 Chapli kebab - A spiced, tangy round kebab made of ground beef and cooked in animal fat. A speciality of Peshawar in Khyber-Pakhtunkhwa.
 Chicken kebab (Moorgh-Kuh-bob) - A popular kebab that is found both with bone and without.
 Lamb kebab - The all lamb meat kebab is usually served as cubes.
 Bihari kebab - Skewer of beef mixed with herbs and seasoning.
 Shashlik - Grilled baby lamb chops (usually from the leg), typically marinated
 Bun kebab - A unique kebab sandwich with beef, lamb, fish or chicken.
 Shawarma - Comprises slices cut from a stack of meat strips (usually lamb), grilled in a vertical rotisserie. These are placed in a naan with chutney and salad.
 Tikka kebab - A kebab made of beef, lamb or chicken, cut into cubes, marinated with a yogurt blend and grilled on coals.
 Boti Kebab - A kebab made from beef, lamb or chicken cubes and is popular in Multan. Sometimes marinated with green papaya to help tenderize the meat.
 Kaleji Kebab - A kebab made of grilled and marinated pieces of beef, lamb or chicken liver, though usually lamb.

See also

 Chicken Lahori
 List of Pakistani soups and stews

References

External links

 
 Pakistani Food

 
Pakistani cuisine